Perfluoromethyldecalin is a fluorocarbon liquid—a perfluorinated derivative of the hydrocarbon methyldecalin. It is chemically and biologically inert.  It is mainly of interest as a blood substitute, exploiting the high solubility of air in this solvent.

Structural Isomers
Most commercially available perfluoromethyldecalin consists of both perfluoro-1-methyldecalin and perfluoro-2-methyldecalin. Each structural isomer has its own CAS registry number (RN).  The mixture also has a unique RN. The two isomers are chemically and physically very similar.

Manufacture
Perfluoromethyldecalin can be manufactured by the Fowler process, which involves moderating the action of elemental fluorine with cobalt fluoride in the gas phase from methylnaphthalene. Methylnaphthalene is preferred as the starting material vs methyldecalin as is consumes less fluorine.

Properties
Perfluoromethyldecalin is chemically inert and thermally stable (to over 400 °C). It has been evaluated as a blood substitute.

It is a colorless liquid, with a relatively high density, low viscosity, and low surface tension that evaporates rapidly for a compounds with its high molecular weight. It is a relatively good solvent for gases, but a poor solvent for solids and liquids.

In common with other cyclic perfluorocarbons, perfluorodecalin can be detected at extremely low concentrations; it has therefore been proposed for use as a perfluorocarbon tracer. Its higher boiling makes it suitable for use in water flow.

Other applications include use as a heat transfer agent and a dielectric fluid.

References 

Fluorocarbons
Halogenated solvents
Coolants